Guy Frederick Ecker (born February 9, 1959) is an American actor.

Ecker became a household name in Latin America for his portrayal of Sebastián Vallejo in the Colombian telenovela Café, con aroma de mujer. A second Colombian production, Guajira also proved successful. In 1998, he moved to Mexico and won his first leading role in a Mexican telenovela, playing opposite Kate del Castillo in the telenovela La Mentira, which also became a huge success. Leading roles in Salomé and Heridas de Amor followed. American viewers may be familiar with him through his work on the television show Las Vegas as Detective Luis Perez.

Biography
Guy Ecker was born in São Paulo, he is the third out of five children (3 girls, 2 boys) of American parents Marion and Bob Ecker. His father was a businessman, originally from Wisconsin, who worked for several multinational companies and, during his childhood, Ecker also lived in Colombia, Venezuela and Mexico.

As a child, Ecker participated in various plays and talent shows. He moved to the United States to attend college at the University of Texas in Austin. He earned a degree in International Business. A few years after graduating, he realized his true passion was acting. One of his earliest acting jobs included juggling eggs on a McDonald's commercial.

On June 24, 2013, it was confirmed that Guy Ecker (along with Susana González) would star as the protagonist in the Mexican telenovela Por siempre mi amor.

In 2015 he starred with Julián Gil in Miller Lite's Rivales ad campaign.

Personal life
He was married to actress Nia Peeples from 1984 to 1986. In 2000, he married the actress Estela Sainz. The couple has three children.

 He has a son, Jon-Michael Ecker, from a previous relationship.

He speaks fluent Portuguese, English and Spanish.

Filmography
1986: Blood Money aka Dinero Sangre DVD [2002] United States  [Amazon.com]

Webnovelas
2009: Vidas Cruzadas .... Daniel

References

External links

Vidas Cruzadas - Guy Ecker new Webnovela
Guy Ecker's Biography, Official website
Miller Lite: Rivales at YouTube

1959 births
Living people
American male telenovela actors
Male actors from São Paulo
University of Texas at Austin alumni
Expatriate male actors in Mexico
Brazilian American
American people of Brazilian descent